Christine Gordon (born 16 May 1978) is a Hong Kong rugby union player. She represented Hong Kong at the 2017 Women's Rugby World Cup in Ireland, it was Hong Kong's first-ever World Cup appearance. She started in their game against New Zealand at Number 8.

Rugby Career 
Gordon has represented Hong Kong in sevens and fifteens. She competed at the 2014 Hong Kong Women's Sevens. She was later selected in Hong Kong's squad for the 2014 Asia Women's Four Nations in May. Gordon was named in Hong Kong's sevens team in 2015, for a qualifier tournament in Ireland as they sought for one of two core team spots that was up for grabs. The winners would be one of the core teams in the 2015–16 Sevens Series.

She featured at the 2016 Hong Kong Women's Sevens, scoring a try in their match against Thailand. In 2017, she was named in the training squad ahead of their Sevens Series Qualifier. Gordon started in both of Hong Kong's matches against Japan at the Asian Championships a month before their World Cup debut.

References 

1978 births
Living people
Hong Kong people
Hong Kong rugby union players
Hong Kong female rugby union players
Hong Kong female rugby sevens players